Hybe Co., Ltd. (stylized as HYBE Corporation) is a South Korean multinational entertainment company established in 2005 by Bang Si-hyuk as Big Hit Entertainment Co., Ltd. The company operates as a record label, talent agency, music production company, event management and concert production company, and music publishing house. It has multiple subsidiaries, including Big Hit Music, Source Music, Pledis Entertainment, Belift Lab, KOZ Entertainment, and ADOR, collectively known as Hybe Labels.

History

2005–2021: Big Hit Entertainment Co., Ltd 
Big Hit Entertainment was founded on February 1, 2005, and signed the vocal trio 8Eight in 2007. In 2010, the company signed a contract with JYP Entertainment to jointly manage the boy group 2AM. That year, Bang Si-hyuk signed RM as the first member of BTS and launched nationwide auditions to recruit other members for the group. BTS made their debut under Big Hit on June 13, 2013.

In 2012, the company signed Lim Jeong-hee, and formed the girl group GLAM as a collaboration with Source Music. The group was active until 2014, when it was disbanded due to a controversy involving one of its members Kim Da-hee. Kim was sentenced to prison after being found guilty of blackmailing actor Lee Byung-hun.

Following the end of the joint contract between Big Hit and JYP in April 2014, three members of 2AM returned to JYP. Lee Chang-min remained with Big Hit to continue with his solo career and as part of the duo Homme. 8Eight disbanded later that year, after Baek Chan and Joo Hee's contracts with Big Hit ended.

In May 2015, Lim parted ways with the agency, following the expiration of her three-year contract, and Signal Entertainment Group, a KOSDAQ-listed company specializing in artist management and television production, acquired Big Hit through a KR₩6 billion convertible bond. In early 2016, Big Hit ended their stake relationship with Signal and made a full settlement of the bonds.

In February 2018, Homme disbanded after member Changmin's contract ended. He left the company to start his own agency, while Lee Hyun continued on as a solo artist. In August, Big Hit and CJ E&M released information stating plans to create a joint entertainment agency, with ownership split 52% to the latter and 48% to the former. Filed under the name Belift, the agency debuted its first boy group Enhypen in November 2020. In October, BTS renewed and extended their contract with the agency for seven more years. Big Hit was voted Best Investment Company of the Year at the 2018 Korea VC Awards in December.

Big Hit debuted its second male group, Tomorrow X Together (TXT), in March 2019. Also that month, former CBO Lenzo Yoon was appointed co-CEO alongside Bang. Yoon would focus on the business components of the company. while Bang's focus would be on creative production. In July 2019, the company acquired Source Music, and in August, the video game firm Superb. Thanks to the Weverse and Weverse Shop apps developed by its subsidiary beNX, Big Hit was named the fourth most innovative company of 2020 worldwide by Fast Company.

In May 2020, Big Hit became the majority shareholder of Pledis Entertainment. The label would retain its independence; however, its artists would now receive greater financial support and global. promotions. The Fair Trade Commission (hereinafter KFTC) approved the acquisition in October. Big Hit acquired KOZ Entertainment, a record label founded by rapper Zico, the following month.

In January 2021, news media reported that Big Hit and beNX had invested a combined ₩70 billion (US$63 million) in YG Plus, acquiring a 17.9% stake in the company in a merchandising and distribution deal that would see the aforementioned's artists join Weverse's social media and shop platforms. Naver Corporation later invested ₩354.8 billion ($321 million) in beNX, acquiring 49% of the subsidiary. In return, it transferred its V Live video streaming service to the latter for the development of a new integrated fan community platform. BeNX was eventually renamed Weverse Company Inc. as a result of the deal with Naver. The merger was approved by the KFTC in May. On February 17, Big Hit and Universal Music Group (UMG) announced a strategic partnership between the two companies to collaborate on various music and technology-related endeavors. At the forefront of the partnership was a joint venture between Big Hit and Geffen Records, a UMG flagship label, that will debut a global boy group through a new, Los Angeles-based label following a global audition program set to air in 2022. Big Hit would be responsible for selecting and training the artists, while UMG would be in charge of music production, global distribution, and marketing. Additionally, other UMG artists, including Yungblud, were set to join Weverse, already home to Gracie Abrams, New Hope Club, and Alexander 23. On February 25, Big Hit announced a ₩4 billion ($3.6 million) investment in a Korea-based AI company, Supertone, that specializes in creating hyper-realistic voices using technology.

2021–present: Hybe Corporation 
Big Hit announced its rebranding into an entertainment lifestyle platform company under the name Hybe Corporation in March 2021. The company underwent a complete organizational restructuring, which also saw the name "Big Hit Entertainment" (as relates to music operations) become Big Hit Music under Hybe's new Labels division. The renaming was approved at a shareholders meeting on March 30. The company relocated to its new headquarters in the Yongsan Trade Center in Yongsan District on March 22, and the rebrand went into effect on March 31. Hybe acquired Scooter Braun's Ithaca Holdings and all its properties, including SB Projects and Big Machine Label Group, through its subsidiary Hybe America in April. The corporation invested $950 million (₩1.07 trillion) into the America branch to finance the buyout; $1.05 billion was paid to Ithaca shareholders and bondholders. BH Odyssey Merger Sub, a newly created subsidiary of Hybe America, facilitated the acquisition, and was later dissolved after the deal's finalization. The Carlyle Group, a minority shareholder and original investor, sold its stake in Ithaca as part of the deal. Braun joined Hybe's board, while Scott Borchetta retained his position as CEO of Big Machine. That same month, Time named Hybe one of the "100 Most Influential Companies of 2021", under the "Pioneers" section.

Japanese streaming platform Showroom announced a business and capital partnership with Hybe in May 2021 to improve its domestic services and expand access to Japanese content in South Korea, the United States, and globally. Hybe was added to the MSCI Korea index on May 12, and the index updated on May 28. Following a second organizational restructuring, Bang resigned as CEO on July 1 to return his focus to music production. He was replaced by Park Ji-won but retained his position as Chairman of the Board of Directors. In November, Hybe entered into an equity-based partnership with Korean fintech company Dunamu to develop a joint venture NFT business for the creation of digital assets. It acquired a 2.6% stake in the company for ₩500 billion ($423.8 million), while Dunamu received a 5.6% stake in Hybe for ₩700 billion ($590 million). On November 11, Hybe won a Red Dot Design Award in the Brands & Communication Design category at the 2021 Red Dot Design Awards for its new corporate identity (CI) design. The establishment of a new music label, ADOR, was announced on November 12. Chief Brand Officer (CBO) Min Hee-jin was appointed as its CEO and tasked with overseeing the management of the label's first girl group, later announced as NewJeans, which debuted in July 2022.

In January 2022, Hybe published a series of "original stories" featuring boy groups BTS, Enhypen, and Tomorrow X Together in collaboration with Webtoon and Wattpad as part of a planned IP expansion. The BTS comic alone earned over 15 million views within two days of release and was the highest-viewed title ever launched by Webtoon. In March, Fast Company named Hybe the 11th most innovative company of the year globally on its annual top-50 list—ranking first in the Media category—while Time included Hybe on its 100 Most Influential Companies list for a second consecutive year. The company topped the "Leaders" category and was dubbed "The Pop Powerhouse" by the outlet for its acquisitions, expansion into the digital frontier, and transformative strides in the music industry during the pandemic era. The following month, Hybe won an iF Product Design Award for "Company Branding" in the Communication category at the International Forum Design Awards held in Germany. Hybe signed a multi-year deal with The Walt Disney Company Asia Pacific in July 2022 to provide content showcasing the Korean music and entertainment industries to a global market. Five programs will be available worldwide on Disney+ and other Disney streaming platforms—a 4K cinematic film of BTS' Permission to Dance on Stage concert in Los Angeles; In the Soop: Friendcation; and BTS Monuments: Beyond the Star, a docuseries of BTS' history from debut to present set to premiere in 2023. Additional content featuring other Hybe artists will also be released.

Hybe became the largest shareholder of SM Entertainment in February 2023, after it acquired founder Lee Soo-man's 14.8% stake in the company for approximately ₩422.8 billion. The company subsequently acquired Galaxia SM's 1% stake on March 3. On March 12, HYBE announced that they no longer planned to own the majority stakes of SM Entertainment, said that the bidding war with Kakao could "damage shareholder value."

Company value and investments
Big Hit Entertainment initially operated as a private company with Bang Si-hyuk as the largest shareholder of its stock. In March 2017, the Korean mobile gaming company Netmarble acquired the second largest percentage of the company, paying a reported ₩201.4 billion ($191.8 million) for 25.71%—its CEO Bang Joon-hyuk, and Bang Si-hyuk are cousins. In October 2018, private investment firm STIC Investments received an undisclosed share of Big Hit for an investment of roughly ₩104 billion ($93 million).

In 2007, Big Hit had four employees and was near bankruptcy, but Bang was able to keep the company afloat after the local success of 8Eight's Without a Heart in 2009. Its value rose over the years thanks to the global popularity of its first boy group BTS. In March 2018, Big Hit's earnings were publicized for the first time. The company reported revenue of ₩92.4 billion ($82 million) and operating profit of ₩32.5 billion ($29 million) for 2017. Initial estimates valued Big Hit at up to ₩700 billion ($624 million) if entered into an IPO that very month, making CEO Bang the richest in the South Korean entertainment business due to his large shareholding position, and leaving him with personal ownership value of roughly ₩350 billion ($314 million). By October 2018, the company was valued at more than ₩1 trillion.

Big Hit's success has been attributed to its innovative management style, more like an IT company than an entertainment company, which has become the new standard in the K-pop industry; it includes a wide usage of social media to capture people's interest and transform it into sales, the creation of artist-related multimedia contents, and the full use of fandom energy. Financials published in March 2019 for the previous year, showed a 132% increase in sales compared to 2017, with Big Hit making approximately ₩214.2 billion ($189.38 million). Operating profit rose 97% to ₩64.1 billion ($56.72 million), while net profit rose 105% to ₩50.2 billion ($44.41 million). By June 2019, the company was valued between ₩1.28–2.22 trillion. As of March 2020, its total value was roughly ₩6 trillion ($5 billion). Big Hit commenced plans to go public on May 21, and applied for a pre-IPO consultation with the Korea Exchange. This is required under South Korean law before a company can file paperwork for an IPO. One week later, the company filed for a preliminary review of their planned IPO. On October 15, Big Hit was listed in the KOSPI index and began trading stocks.

In February 2021, Big Hit published its first annual report since going public. The company recorded net income of ₩86.2 billion ($77.6 million) for 2020, a 19.1% increase compared to the previous year's ₩72.4 billion. Operating profit rose 44.3% to ₩142.4 billion, while sales increased 35.6% to ₩796.3 billion—bolstered in part by strong album sales and the company's various acquisitions—with Big Hit experiencing its best quarterly performance yet in the fourth quarter of 2020. Though concert revenue decreased in the wake of the COVID-19 pandemic, merchandise, fan-club, and online-content revenue increased 53%, 71%, and 66%, respectively.

Per Hybe's 2021 financial report released in February 2022, the company recorded annual revenue of ₩1.2 trillion, operating profit of ₩190.3 billion, and net income of ₩141 billion ($118 million), a 58, 30.8, and 62.8% increase respectively, compared to 2020. It is the first South Korean music agency to surpass the ₩1 trillion ($838 million) benchmark.

Divisions and subsidiaries

Hybe HQ
Hybe HQ is a wholly-owned subsidiary of Hybe Corporation. The company comprises three divisions: Hybe Labels, Hybe Solutions, and Hybe Platforms. Under each division are wholly or partially owned subsidiaries of its parent corporation.

Labels

This is the entertainment and music production division. Prior to the rebranding, it was known as Big Hit Labels. Subsidiaries within the division operate independently of Hybe Corporation but receive support for creative activities.
 Big Hit Music
 BTS
 Tomorrow X Together
 Lee Hyun
 Belift Lab (with CJ E&M)
 Enhypen
Source Music
 Le Sserafim
ADOR
 NewJeans
 Pledis Entertainment
 Seventeen
 Baekho
 Minhyun
 Bumzu
 Nana
 Yehana
 Sungyeon
 Fromis 9
KOZ Entertainment
 Zico
 Dvwn

Solutions
The "solutions" division is made up of specialized business units for video content, IP, learning, and games. Secondary and tertiary businesses are created based on the creative output of each label. In May 2021, Hybe Edu signed a business agreement with the International Korean Language Education Foundation (IKLEF) to develop Korean-language textbooks for distribution to overseas elementary and secondary schools through the Ministry of Education beginning in 2022. Various other online and offline content will also be created using BTS IP in response to an increasing demand for Korean-language education in foreign countries. On July 2, 2021, it was announced that Hybe Solutions subsidiaries Hybe 360 and Hybe IP had been dissolved and merged into Hybe Corporation.
 Hybe Edu
 Superb

Platforms
This is the technology division. It manages the social networking and entertainment platform Weverse, which serves as a hub for connecting and expanding all of Hybe's contents and services. In May 2021, Weverse Company invested in US startup Fave, an F2F platform for fandoms, as part of its plans to strengthen business opportunities in that territory.
 Weverse Company
 Weverse
 Weverse Shop
 V Live (until its deactivation in December 2022)

Hybe America
Prior to the rebrand, the subsidiary was known as Big Hit America. Following the rebranding, Hybe Corporation bought over all ₩1.7 trillion ($1.5 billion) of Big Hit America's shares, making it a wholly owned subsidiary under the corporation, and it became Hybe America. This was in preparation for Hybe Corporation's acquisition of Ithaca Holdings through Hybe America. BH Odyssey Merger Sub was created as a subsidiary of Hybe America to facilitate its buyout of Ithaca. Once finalized, Ithaca would become a subsidiary of Hybe America, and BH Odyssey would be dissolved. The merger is assumed to have been completed in the first quarter of 2021 per quarterly earning reports published on May 14.

In July 2021, Yoon and Braun were appointed co-CEOs of Hybe America, and jointly managed US operations. Yoon was responsible for "the localization of Hybe's K-pop business model in the US" and "oversee[ing] the training, production and marketing process through which new talent is discovered" while Braun focused "on solidifying Hybe's presence in the US music industry" and "cementing [the company's] competitiveness in the stateside market". Chief Strategy Officer (CSO) Jaesang Lee, who led the Ithaca acquisition, was made Chief Operations Officer (COO). Plans for the launch of a new global girl group in collaboration with Geffen were announced on November 4; auditions closed on November 28. Braun became the sole CEO in January 2023, subsequently leading the acquisition of the American entertainment company QC Media Holdings in February.

 Ithaca Holdings
 Atlas Music Publishing
 Big Machine Label Group
 BMLG Records
 Big Machine Records
 The Valory Music Co.
 Mythos Studios
 Raised in Space
 SB Projects
 SB Consulting
 SB Management
 SB Ventures
 Schoolboy Entertainment
 Schoolboy Records (with Universal Music Group)
 Sheba Publishing
 Silent Labs
 QC Media Holdings
 Quality Control Music
 Solid Foundation Management
 Quality Films
 QC Sports

Hybe Japan
Following Hybe's second leadership restructuring in July 2021, its Japanese subsidiaries, Hybe Solutions Japan and Hybe T&D Japan, were integrated to form a regional headquarters, Hybe Japan. The Japanese branch operates as an independent entity under CEO and former Hybe Solutions Japan CEO Han Hyun-rock. It oversees music production, music publishing, music copyright management, artist management, and talent scouting and development, as well as facilitates the entry of other Hybe artists into the Japanese market. Hybe Labels Japan debuted its first boy group, &Team, in December 2022. A collaboration with Hiroomi Tosaka of J Soul Brothers on the creation of a new girl group is forthcoming.

Labels 
 Hybe Labels Japan
 &Team
 Naeco
 Yurina Hirate

Solutions 
 Hybe Solutions Japan
 Hybe T&D Japan

Filmography

Drama 
 Youth (TBA) (with Chorokbaem Media)

Exhibitions 
 "Hybe Insight" (2021) in South Korea

Reality and variety 
 I-Land (2020, Mnet) (with CJ ENM and Studio Take One)
 &Audition – The Howling (2022, Hulu Japan & Hybe Labels YouTube Channel)

Concerts and festivals

Philanthropy 
On February 13, 2023, Hybe donated 500 million won to help 2023 Turkey–Syria earthquake, by donating money through Save the Children.

Notes

References

External links
 

 
2020 initial public offerings
Companies based in Seoul
Companies listed on the Korea Exchange
Electronic dance music record labels
Entertainment companies established in 2005
Music production companies
Music publishing companies of South Korea
K-pop record labels
Record labels established in 2005
South Korean brands
South Korean record labels
Soul music record labels
Synth-pop record labels
Talent agencies of South Korea